Megachile grandibarbis is a species of bee in the family Megachilidae. It was described by Pérez in 1899.

References

Grandibarbis
Insects described in 1899